West Point Grey is a neighbourhood in the northwest of the city of Vancouver, British Columbia, Canada. It is located on Point Grey and is bordered by 16th Avenue to the south, Alma Street to the east, English Bay to the north, and Blanca Street to the west. Notable beaches within the West Point Grey boundary include Spanish Banks, Locarno and Jericho. Immediately to the south is Pacific Spirit Regional Park and to the east is Kitsilano.

In 2016, West Point Grey had an estimated population of 13,065 of the total 631,485 residents in the City of Vancouver. Its population has remained relatively stable from 2011, when it was 12,795. The 2016 Canadian Census reported a median household income of $84,951 in the neighbourhood, which was nearly $20,000 higher than the City of Vancouver median income of $65,423. The most common mother tongue in 2016 was English at 63.6 percent, with Chinese second at 18.9 percent. In 2001, English was at 75.1 percent and Chinese second at 9.3 percent.

Schools within the West Point Grey Boundary include Lord Byng Secondary School, Our Lady of Perpetual Help, Queen Elizabeth Elementary School, Queen Mary Elementary School, École Jules Quesnel and the private pre-kindergarten to Grade 12 school West Point Grey Academy.

The main commercial strip with shops and restaurants is along West 10th Avenue between Tolmie Street and Discovery Street. North of West 4th Avenue, the area slopes steeply downhill where it meets English Bay at Locarno Beach and the Spanish Banks.

Fiesta Days, a family oriented carnival, is held along 10th Avenue and at Trimble Park in June, with rides, games, performances and a parade.

Jericho Lands 
In a historic agreement in 2014, the larger eastern parcel was acquired by a joint ownership group composed of the Musqueam, Squamish, and Tsleil-Waututh Nations and Canada Lands Company. In 2016, the Musqueam, Squamish, and Tsleil-Waututh Nations partnership acquired the smaller western parcel from the provincial government. The entire area is slated for redevelopment and initial public engagement began in March 2019 in conjunction with the City of Vancouver.

To the west, the Jericho Hill Grounds is a  property formerly owned by the provincial government and houses the West Point Grey Academy private school. The eastern  parcel is termed the "Jericho Garrison property" and was previously owned by the Department of Defence. It housed various military branches throughout the 20th century. The 39 Canadian Brigade Group, headquarters for all the Canadian Forces' Army Primary Reserve units in British Columbia, previously had its headquarters in the northeastern section of the neighbourhood, which is home to Vancouver's largest youth hostel.

According to ancient First Nations legend, Point Grey is the "Battleground of the West Wind". The rock representing the god of the West Wind, which is sitting off the point, is called Homolsom. As the rock is sitting between their two territories, Homolsom is half a Squamish word and half a Fraser River language word.

References

External links 
City of Vancouver Neighbourhood Profile

Neighbourhoods in Vancouver